Norah Meade Corcoran (1888-23 January 1954) was an Irish journalist and humanitarian.

Career
Norah Meade was born in Dublin, Ireland, to Patrick Meade, a journalist.

She wrote reviews, fiction stories and investigative stories for newspapers and magazines both in Ireland and the United States. She wrote under her maiden and married names, Norah Meade, Norah Corcoran and Norah Meade Corcoran.

While living in Ireland she wrote for such publications as the Weekly Freeman. An example of her work is the critique of Peadar Ua Laoghaire in "The Contemporary Irish National Movement in Literature" in 1910.

Once she moved to the US, she wrote for a wide number of papers and on a wide number of topics. Her New York World (magazine section) column was syndicated in other papers like the Fort Wayne Journal-Gazette in Indiana. Meade also wrote freelance for such titles as The Boston Globe.

Meade was involved in the American Relief Administration. She was a witness to the Russian Famine in 1921 and worked with Herbert Hoover to provide relief.

She returned to the United States again after a trip to Europe in 1923 sailing on the RMS Homeric. On this trip she was already married.

While based in the US Meade also worked with Harry Gilchriese on publicity for the Girl Scouts of the USA from 1929-1937. She wrote articles for the Girl Scouts which appeared across the country.

Meade returned to Ireland in 1952 and was living in Dublin until her death in 1954.

Reviews and articles
 Impressions of Soviet Russia and the Revolutionary World, Mexico - China - Turkey, reviewed in the Saturday review of Literature 4 May 1929.
 Anna Livia Plurabelle reviewed "nonesense of new art" New York Herald Tribune Books 13 September 1931.
 
 
 
 The Pittsburgh Press - May 21, 1916
 Catholic Girl Scouting, Catholic World 145 (1937)

References

External links
 Norah Meade Corcoran Obituary and New York Times Obituary

Irish women journalists
People from County Dublin
Irish non-fiction writers
Irish women non-fiction writers
1888 births
1954 deaths
20th-century non-fiction writers